Davison's Mill, also known as Stelling Minnis Windmill, is a Grade I listed smock mill in Stelling Minnis, Kent, England that was built in 1866. It was the last windmill working commercially in Kent when it closed in the autumn of 1970.

The mill is managed by the Stelling Minnis Windmill and Museum Trust, which came into being on 26 January 2010. It is open to visitors each year from Easter Sunday to the end of September on Sundays and Bank Holidays, from 2pm to 5pm. Its grounds host the annual Stelling Minnis fete.

History

Davison's mill was built in 1866 by the Canterbury millwright Thomas Holman, replacing an earlier open trestle post mill with common sails. Milling by wind ceased in 1925, but the mill continued to work by a Ruston & Hornsby oil engine which had been added in 1923. In April 1935, the mill was restored to full working order. The work was financed by H Laurie, as a memorial to her brother Colonel Ronald Macdonald Laurie, who had died on 21 October 1927. Laurie was awarded a Windmill Certificate by the Society for the Protection of Ancient Buildings in 1936. One pair of sails was blown off in the early 1950s, and the mill worked afterwards with a single pair, assisted by the engine. Elham Rural District Council donated £100 towards the cost of repairs estimated at £500 in the 1950s. When Alec Davison retired in the autumn of 1970, the mill was the last in Kent working commercially by wind. After the death of Mr Davison, the mill was acquired by Kent County Council. A restoration of the mill commenced in 2003, with the sails being taken down on 19 July and the cap removed on 20 July. The work was financed by the Heritage Lottery Fund and Kent County Council. It was carried out by IJP Millwrights of Binfield Heath, Berkshire and took three months to complete.

Description

Davison's mill is a four-storey smock mill with a stage at first-floor level. It has four patent sails carried on a cast-iron windshaft. The mill is winded by a fantail. The mill drives two pairs of millstones underdrift. The Brake wheel is iron. This drives a cast-iron Wallower. The Great Spur Wheel is also of cast iron.

The engine is a Ruston & Hornsby "1912" hot-bulb engine, which was despatched from Holman's in Canterbury on 7 May 1923.

Millers

Colver (post mill)
George Goble 1866 - 1878
Henry William Davison 1878 -
Alec Davison 1940 - 1970

References for above:-

References

External links

 Stelling Minnis Windmill and Museum - official site
Windmill World page on the mill.

Windmills in Kent
Grinding mills in the United Kingdom
Smock mills in England
Grade I listed buildings in Kent
Monuments and memorials in Kent
Windmills completed in 1866
Museums in Folkestone and Hythe District
Mill museums in England
Grade I listed windmills
Octagonal buildings in the United Kingdom
1866 establishments in England